M-1.1 highway is a Montenegrin roadway.

The M-1.1 highway is built to half of motorway standard. It is planned to become part of Bar-Boljare motorway. Main part of this highway is Sozina tunnel, which is 4,189 m long. It serves as bypass the mountain range "Paštrovska Gora" that separates Montenegrin coast from Zeta plain and Skadar Lake basin. Distance between Podgorica, capitol of Montenegro and Bar, main port is shortened by approximately 25km. The M-1.1 highway is also part of  International E-roads.

History

Sozina tunnel was opened on 13 July 2005, and is also the day when this road was opened. In January 2016, the Ministry of Transport and Maritime Affairs published bylaw on categorisation of state roads categorising this road as M-1.1.

Major intersections

References

M-1.1